Pseudotelphusa tessella is a moth of the family Gelechiidae. It is found in Spain, France, Germany, Austria, Switzerland, the Czech Republic, Slovakia, Slovenia, Serbia and Romania.

The wingspan  is 13–15 mm.

The larvae feed on Berberis vulgaris. The larvae live between spun leaves of their host plant.

References

Moths described in 1758
Taxa named by Carl Linnaeus
Pseudotelphusa